is a train station located in Katsushika, Tokyo.

Lines

Keisei Electric Railway
 Keisei Main Line

Layout
This station consists of two side platforms serving two tracks.

Platforms

History

 1931 - Horikirishōbuen station begins operation.
 2010 - Station numbering was introduced to all Keisei Line stations; Horikirishōbuen was assigned station number KS07.

Around area
Horikiri Station: It takes about ten minutes from this station to Horikiri Station, and if you go to Horikiri Station, you have to walk on the bridge which overs Arakawa River (Kantō).
Horikiri Shobuen: Five minute's walk will bring to Horikiri Shobuen where is located south side of this station.

References

Railway stations in Japan opened in 1931
Railway stations in Tokyo
Keisei Main Line